Tanahbesar (or Wokam) is one of the four main islands in the Aru Islands Regency in the Arafura Sea. Its area is 1604 km².
It is situated in the Maluku Province, Indonesia. 
The other main islands in the archipelago are Kobroor, Kola, Maikoor, Koba and Trangan.

References 

Aru Islands
Islands of the Maluku Islands
Uninhabited islands of Indonesia